Dame Commander Patricia Ann McGrath  (born 11 June 1971) is a British make-up artist. She has been called the most influential make-up artist in the world by Vogue magazine and other commentators. In 2019 she was included in Time's 100 most influential people list. She is the first make-up artist to be made a Dame Commander of the British Empire.

Early life
McGrath was born and raised in Northampton, England in 1965, in a working-class household by her mother, Jean, who was a dressmaker and a Jehovah's Witness. Jean became a big influence on her daughter's eventual career in make-up, teaching and encouraging her to experiment with make-up and inspiring her love for fashion. McGrath has Jamaican ancestry.

McGrath has no formal training in fashion or make-up, having completed only an art foundation course at Northampton College. She has said of her career: "I really love being a makeup artist. It never gets mundane or predictable and every shoot and show is different." In the 1980s, McGrath moved to London and became involved with designers such as Alexander McQueen and John Galliano.

Career

McGrath's first breakthrough occurred in the early 1990s working alongside Edward Enninful at i-D magazine, continuing to work as a receptionist to support herself financially. In 1999 she was hired by Giorgio Armani to collaborate on a new range of cosmetics and became the recipient of the Pantene Pro-V Make-Up Artist Of The Year Award in both 2000 & 2001.

McGrath was appointed Member of the Order of the British Empire (MBE) in the 2014 New Year Honours for services to the fashion and beauty industry. Ten years prior, in 2004, McGrath was also hired by Procter & Gamble, as Global Cosmetics Creative Design Director in a multi-year partnership that was rumoured to be paid at $1 million 

In 2015 she launched 'Pat McGrath Labs.', her own line of beauty products which by 2019 had become a $1 billion company and becoming the biggest selling beauty line at Selfridges.

In 2017, McGrath was hired by Enninful as Beauty Editor-at-Large for British Vogue and in the same year won the Isabella Blow Award for Fashion Creator at the Fashion Awards, a British Fashion Council Event. In 2018, six leading stars, including Saoirse Ronan, Naomie Harris and Sara Sampaio, wore Pat McGrath Labs make-up to the Fashion Awards. McGrath has also regularly appeared in the Top 10 of the Powerlist, highlighting the most influential Black British people across a number of industries 

McGrath was appointed Dame Commander of the Order of the British Empire (DBE) in the 2021 New Year Honours for services to the fashion and beauty industry and diversity and was the first ever make-up artist to be given this honour.

Artistry
According to Vogue (2007), McGrath is known for her unique, adventurous, and innovative make-up techniques which include using her hands as opposed to brushes. She has a talent for using bold hues and material experimentation ranging from feathers to ornaments. McGrath is limitless, a mindset that enables her boundless creativity and diverse range of looks.
Her art lies within the reinvention of makeup and experimentation. Her innovative and intuitive outlook to life help create the vibrant and legendary looks we see throughout numerous catwalks and fashion shows.

Inspiration
McGrath draws inspiration from many sources, using materials such as feathers, gold leaf, and leather. McGrath told Vogue in 2008, "I'm influenced a lot by the fabrics I see, the colours that are in the collections and the girl's faces. It's always a challenge but that's the key – to make it different every time." Her inspiration started with her mother, particularly her love for fashion, film and costumes: "Everything that she was obsessed with, I became obsessed with." McGrath's mother encouraged her stating "It will be a problem for you if you don't love what you do. So make sure!" Growing up in London, McGrath and her mother used to go makeup shopping when she was six years old. Fashion became a huge inspiration for McGrath, stimulating her creative approach.

McGrath also looks to models that bring her personal inspiration. McGrath says, "They are their own women, representing a mix of ethnicities, sizes, and backgrounds, they allow me to experiment and create the looks I dream of in my head." She considers models Naomi Campbell, Hailey Baldwin, Paloma Elsesser, Jasmine Sanders, Mallory Merk and Ruby Aldridge as her muses. She says of Campbell, "We've worked together since the mid-1990s, and she inspires me in ways I've never imagined. There is no one like Naomi." McGrath calls Paloma Elsesser's face "the ultimate canvas", for her hypnotic complexion that "guides a makeup artist's touch."

Much of McGrath's inspiration derives from making the natural skin salient. This can be seen in her own makeup line, which focuses on luminous skin. McGrath says, "Flawless, luminous skin has always been a constant in my work. For years I've been using a custom mix of products to achieve different levels of luminosity from fresh baby skin to a supercharged power-glow." The sequin packaging of her makeup line also derives from McGrath's inspiration of sequins, a reoccurring element in many of her looks.

The most important element of McGrath's inspiration stems from unique individuality and beauty, breaking away from traditional standards. McGrath values beauty beyond superficiality, looking at the story behind the person she sees. On the definition of beauty, she believes that "real and true beauty comes from within. It's like an energy, because the task of bringing out beauty—and at times creating it—really is like a puzzle. Often in my work, the approach to beauty is to seek perfection, yet sometimes beauty is imperfect or quite raw."

Filmography

Music videos

References

1970 births
Living people
British make-up artists
English people of Jamaican descent
People from Northampton
Dames Commander of the Order of the British Empire
British cosmetics businesspeople